Andrew Evans (born January 25, 1991) is an American track and field athlete who competes in the discus throw.

Born to Lawrence and Laura Evans he grew up in Portage, Michigan. He competed in ice hockey, American football and discus at high school.

As a sophomore, 2007, Andrew finished as MI MHSAA D1 State Discus Runner-Up with a throw of 162'5". He also finished as All-State in Shot Put his sophomore year with a throw of 52'10.75".

He is two time MHSAA Division 1 State Discus Champion (2008 - 180'8" & 2009 - 182'10") from Portage Northern High School, MI. He finished as State Runner-Up in Shot Put in 2008 - 60'4" - & 2009 - 57'9.75",  The PN T&F team finished 2nd in the State of Michigan D1 championship in 2009.

 He made his international debut at the 2010 World Junior Championships in Athletics, taking tenth place. After a period at Kalamazoo Valley Community College he went on to attend the University of Kentucky from 2011 and took part in competitions with the Kentucky Wildcats team.

He was the winner of the discus at the Southeastern Conference outdoor championships in 2012 and 2014, finishing runner-up in the interim. At the NCAA Men's Division I Outdoor Track and Field Championships he was seventh in 2012 and improved to third in 2013. In his final year, he fell back to 14th place, however.

Leaving college and turning professional, he entered the 2015 USA Outdoor Track and Field Championships and took third place. He failed to obtain the qualifying standard for the 2015 World Championships in Athletics, however. Both he and Russ Winger contested the final place at the 2015 NACAC Championships in Athletics and it ultimately went to Winger, with Evans being the silver medalist at the NACAC meet.

At age 25 he made his first American Olympic team with a third-place finish at the 2016 United States Olympic Trials, finishing behind Mason Finley and Tavis Bailey.

International competitions

References

External links
 
 

1991 births
Living people
Track and field athletes from Michigan
People from Portage, Michigan
American male discus throwers
Kentucky Wildcats men's track and field athletes
Athletes (track and field) at the 2016 Summer Olympics
Olympic track and field athletes of the United States
21st-century American people